This is a selected list of roguelike video games. Roguelike games are those that incorporate elements of role-playing games with procedural generation, following the formula of the genre's namesake, Rogue. Due to the large number of variations on this concept, roguelikes are normally classified as either being a classical roguelike with qualities that meet the "Berlin Interpretation" for roguelikes, or as hybrid roguelikes, roguelike-likes, roguelites, or procedural death labyrinths, which possess some but not all of these qualities.

Legend

List of roguelike games
The following is a list of roguelike games that are generally considered to hold true to the Berlin Interpretation of a "roguelike".

Hybrid roguelikes
These are games that feature elements of roguelike games but not necessarily all of the features as defined by the Berlin Interpretation. Terms like "hybrid roguelike", "roguelike-like", "rogue-lite", and "procedural death labyrinth" are used to distinguish them from traditional roguelike games. In most cases, hybrids feature common elements like procedural level generation, randomized item and adversary placement, and permadeath.

Note

Timelines of video games
Roguelike video games
 
Role-playing